The Supreme Court of California is the highest judicial body in the state and sits at the apex of the judiciary of California. Its membership consists of the Chief Justice of California and six associate justices who are nominated by the Governor of California and appointed after confirmation by the California Commission on Judicial Appointments. The Commission consists of the Chief Justice, the Attorney General of California, and the state's senior presiding justice of the California Courts of Appeal; the senior Associate Justice fills the Chief Justice's spot on the commission when a new Chief Justice is nominated. Justices of the Supreme Court serve 12-year terms and receive a salary which is currently set at $250,075 per year for the Chief Justice and between $228,703 and $236,260 per year for each associate justice.

Under the 1849 Constitution of California, the Supreme Court had a chief justice and two associate justices, with six-year terms of office.  An 1862 constitutional amendment expanded the Court to a Chief Justice and four associate justices, with 10-year terms. Since the adoption of the 1879 Constitution, the Court has had a chief justice and six associate justices, with 12-year terms.

The 1849 Constitution specified that the first Supreme Court justices would be appointed by the Legislature and that the justices would be subject to partisan direct elections from that point forward.  The Governor could appoint justices in the event of a vacancy on the Court in between the elections.  In 1910, elections for the Supreme Court became nonpartisan.  In 1934, the state implemented the present system of gubernatorial appointment with retention elections, replacing the direct election of justices.

List of justices
 Chief Justice Jackson Temple did not seek re-election in 1871, was elected as an associate justice in 1886 but resigned in 1889, and was again elected as an associate justice in 1895 serving (until his death in 1902).  Therefore, he is listed three times.
  denotes justices who served as chief justice for at least part of their tenure on the court while  denotes currently-serving justices.

References

Sources

External links
California Courts Past & Present Justices
California Supreme Court Justices from the California Supreme Court Historical Society
Supreme Court of California

 
California
Justices
Justices